Solute carrier family 15, member 4 is a protein in humans that is encoded by the SLC15A4 gene.

References

Further reading 

Genes on human chromosome 12
Solute carrier family